Thomas Charlton was an English professional association footballer who played as a winger.

He began his career with Darlington, but spent the majority of his career with Stockport County, making 93 league appearances and scoring 26 goals in four years.
[1911 census shows Thomas Charlton, aged 24 as a Professional Footballer with Stockport County F.C. Census gives his birthplace as Hexham, Durham and his address in 1911 as 10 Bakewell Street, Stockport where he was a boarder with his wife Violet and his son, also called Thomas.

After a short spell with Burnley in 1913, Charlton joined the Clarets' Lancashire neighbours Blackpool later that year. He made his debut for the Seasiders, who still hadn't appointed a full-time manager, on 22 December, in a 2–2 draw with Leeds City at Bloomfield Road. He went on to make a further twenty-two league appearances during the 1913–14 campaign, scoring three goals in the process (including the only goal of the game in Blackpool's visit to Leicester Fosse on Christmas Day). He also started in Blackpool's FA Cup first-round exit at Gillingham on 10 January.

References

Year of birth unknown
Footballers from Middlesbrough
English footballers
Association football midfielders
Darlington F.C. players
Stockport County F.C. players
Burnley F.C. players
Blackpool F.C. players
English Football League players
Year of death missing